Ron Cameron (12 December 1923 – 13 May 2009) is a Canadian rower. He competed at the 1948 Summer Olympics and the 1952 Summer Olympics.

References

1923 births
2009 deaths
Canadian male rowers
Olympic rowers of Canada
Rowers at the 1948 Summer Olympics
Rowers at the 1952 Summer Olympics
Place of birth missing